Constitution of 1925 may refer to one of the following:
 Chilean Constitution of 1925
 Greek Constitution of 1925 (see Constitutional history of Greece#The Second Hellenic Republic and the Restoration (1925–1941))
 Constitution of Iraq, which first came into force in 1925
 1925 Constitution of the Russian SFSR

See also 
 Constitution (Amendment No. 1) Act 1925, an Act amending the Constitution of the Irish Free State